WFUL (1270 AM) was a radio station  broadcasting a country music format. Formerly licensed to Fulton, Kentucky, United States, the station was owned by River County Broadcasting, Inc.

History
Although the station originally carried the call sign WFUL, the call sign was changed on March 17, 1988, to WKZT, in honor of longtime Fulton, Kentucky resident Kenneth Z. Turner, who had recently died. On July 5, 2004, the station changed its call sign back to WFUL.

On March 28, 2012, the station's license was cancelled and its callsign deleted from the Federal Communications Commission's database, per the licensee's request.

References

FUL
Radio stations disestablished in 2012
Defunct radio stations in the United States
2012 disestablishments in Kentucky
FUL